Villem Reimann (19 March 1906 in Pärnu – 8 April 1992 in Tallinn) was an Estonian composer and pedagogue.

From 1925 to 1927 he studied piano in Tallinn Conservatory. In 1933 he graduated from Tallinn Conservatory in composition speciality under instructor Artur Kapp, and in 1936 in piano specialty under Artur Lemba.

From 1942 to 1992 he was a pedagogue of music theory subjects and chamber music in Estonian Academy of Music and Theatre.

Since 1944 he was a member of Estonian Composers' Union.

Works

References

1906 births
1992 deaths
20th-century Estonian composers
Academic staff of the Estonian Academy of Music and Theatre
People from Pärnu
Soviet composers